Gallic is an adjective that may describe:
 ancient Gaul (Latin: Gallia),   roughly corresponding to the territory of modern France
pertaining to the Gauls
Roman Gaul (1st century BC to 5th century)
Gallic Empire (260–273)
Frankish Gaul (5th to 8th centuries)
 A Latinism for France, the French people, and their customs 
 Gallic epoch, an obsolete epoch of the Cretaceous
 pertaining to  gall, a formation induced by a parasite in plants, 
hence the name gallic acid, for a phenolic compound found in these formations

'Gallic' is also a proper noun naming the following ships:
 , a paddle wheel steamship
 , a cargo steamship

See also 
 Gaulish 
 Gallican
 Galician (disambiguation)
 Gaelic (disambiguation) 
 Gallium, a chemical element
 Galik script, a variation of the traditional Mongolian script
 Gallica (disambiguation)
 Gallicism